The Africa Scout Region of the World Organization of the Scout Movement has run or sponsored region-wide Africa Scout Jamborees in its member countries.

List of Africa Scout Jamborees

The 6th Africa Scout Jamboree (or Africa Jamboree 2012) took place at Bungere, Gitega Province, Burundi from July 28 to August 6, 2012. The theme was Scouting for a positive change. The Jamboree was hosted by the Burundi Scout Association. Almost all African countries took part, together with six European countries.

Africa Rover Moot
The 1st "Africa Rover Moot", hosted by the Kenya Scouts Association, is scheduled to take place in April 2023.

External links
https://web.archive.org/web/20130601064331/http://scout.org/en/around_the_world/africa/information_events/resource_centre/kudumail_newsletter/kudumail_n_11 Issue 11 of Kudumail, with information about the Jamboree]

References

Scouting jamborees
Scouting and Guiding in Burundi
2012 in Burundi